Eddie 'Kwagga' Boucher (born 17 June 1983 in Kroonstad) is a retired South African rugby union player. His regular position was hooker or prop. These days he is a winemaker and the owner of the wine farm La Boucher wines in Stellenbosch.

Early life
Boucher was born in Kroonstad on 17 June 1983 and was educated at Sarel Cilliers High School.

Career
Boucher came through the youth structures at Welkom, Free State and Griffons, where he played for the U19 side in 2002. In 2006, he was named as a member of the Griffons training squad for the Vodacom Cup He moved to Boland Cavaliers in 2010 and was named in the 2011 Vodacom Cup squad. However, he was on the fringes and struggled with injuries. He played no games for the club before moving back to Welkom in 2011. He played two games there before announcing his retirement in 2012 due to injury.

References

South African rugby union players
1983 births
Boland Cavaliers players
Griffons (rugby union) players
Living people
People from Kroonstad
Rugby union hookers
Rugby union players from the Free State (province)